Saint-Thurien is a commune in the Finistère department of Brittany in north-western France.

It takes its name from Saint Turiaf of Dol, bishop of the ancient Diocese of Dol.

Population
Inhabitants of Saint-Thurien are called in French Thuriennois.

Geography

Historically, the town belongs to Cornouaille. It lies in the valley of the  river Isole. Saint-Thurien is border by Guiscriff to the north, by Querrien to the east, by Mellac to the south and by Bannalec to the west. Apart from the village centre, there are about sixty hamlets.

Map

List of places

History

The parish church was rebuilt at the end of the nineteenth century in accordance with the architect Joseph Bigot's plans. The new church replaced an older church that dated from the sixteenth century.

Economy

The Peny factory, located on the banks of the river Isole, with 340 employees, in the main employer in the town.

International relations
Since 1995, it is twinned with the village of Kilmacow in County Kilkenny, Ireland .

Gallery

See also
Communes of the Finistère department
Entry on sculptor of Saint Thurien war memorial Jean Joncourt

References

External links
Mayors of Finistère Association 

Communes of Finistère